The Shan State National Army (abbreviated SSNA) was a Shan nationalist insurgent group that fought against the then ruling State Peace and Development Council military regime of Myanmar (Burma). The commander of the SSNA was Colonel Kan Yod.

History
The Shan State National Army was formed on 7 July 1995 by disgruntled members of Khun Sa's Mong Tai Army (MTA). The group claimed the MTA was too focused on trafficking narcotics from China into Myanmar, rather than focusing on the self-determination of the Shan people. The two leaders and 500 other insurgents decided split from the MTA.

By September 1995, around 2,000 more insurgents had joined the SSNA, leaving the MTA headquarters at Ha Mong and establishing a base in the town of Hsipaw. The Mong Tai Army eventually surrendered to government forces and disbanded after the mass desertion. The SSNA signed a ceasefire with the government at the end of 1995.

2005 government operation
In April 2005, soldiers of the Tatmadaw and the United Wa State Army conducted a joint operation against the headquarters of the SSNA, resulting in the arrest most of their leaders. On 11 April 2005 and 19 May 2005, two brigades of the SSNA surrendered and disarmed after being instructed by the Tatmadaw to leave the area to government forces. Following the operation, SSNA commander Sai Yi and about 5,000 to 6,000 soldiers left the SSNA and joined the Shan State Army - South (SSA-S), led by Colonel Yawd Serk.

Dissolution
After the imprisonment of most of its leaders, the SSNA brigades either surrendered and disarmed or joined the SSA-S in May 2005.
 The 1st Brigade was disarmed
 The 6th Brigade joined the SSA-S
 The 9th Brigade joined the SSA-S
 The 11th Brigade under U Kanna was disarmed
 The 16th Brigade joined the SSA-S
 The 19th Brigade surrendered but did not disarm

See also 
 Internal conflict in Burma
 Shan people

References

External links
 Photos of United Wa State Army (UWSA) and Shan State Army-South (SSA-S) military outposts along the border of Thailand, Chiang Rai province
 Shanland

Shan militia groups
Paramilitary organisations based in Myanmar
Politics of Myanmar
1995 establishments in Myanmar